The 2017 Tevlin Women's Challenger was a professional tennis tournament played on indoor hard courts. It was the 13th edition of the tournament and part of the 2017 ITF Women's Circuit, offering a total of $50,000 in prize money. It took place in Toronto, Ontario, Canada between October 30 and November 5, 2017.

Singles main-draw entrants

Seeds

1 Rankings are as of October 23, 2017

Other entrants
The following players received wildcards into the singles main draw:
 Petra Januskova
 Catherine Leduc
 Ann Li
 Erin Routliffe

The following player entered the singles main draw with a protected ranking:
 Ysaline Bonaventure

The following players received entry into the singles main draw by special exempts:
 Gréta Arn
 Xu Shilin

The following players received entry from the qualifying draw:
 Elena Bovina
 Safiya Carrington
 Tamaryn Hendler
 Kennedy Shaffer

Champions

Singles

 Ysaline Bonaventure def.  Patty Schnyder, 7–6(7–3), 6–3

Doubles

 Alexa Guarachi /  Erin Routliffe def.  Ysaline Bonaventure /  Victoria Rodríguez, 7–6(7–4), 3–6, [10–4]

External links
Official website

Tevlin Women's Challenger
Tevlin Women's Challenger
Tevlin Women's Challenger